The R617 road is a regional road in County Cork, Ireland. It travels from the N20 road to the R579 road, via Blarney, Tower and Cloghroe.

References

Regional roads in the Republic of Ireland
Roads in County Cork